The Suncoast Lions Football Club is the former name of the reserve team of the Brisbane Lions Australian Football Club which competed in the Queensland State League Australian rules football competition.  The team played home matches at the Brisbane Cricket Ground (as a curtain raiser game for Brisbane Lions matches) and, formerly, at the Fishermans Road football complex on the Sunshine Coast.

The Brisbane Lions reserves operate under the name of Brisbane Lions since 2011. From 2011 until 2020, the Brisbane Lions reserves competed in the North East Australian Football League, and from 2021 onwards compete in the Victorian Football League.

References 

Sport in the Sunshine Coast, Queensland
Suncoast
Australian rules football clubs in Queensland
Australian rules football clubs in Brisbane
Brisbane Lions